This is a round-up of the 1987 Sligo Senior Football Championship. St. Mary's won their eighth title in eleven attempts, after defeating holders Tubbercurry in the fifth successive final between the sides. This year's Championship saw the return of the group stages used from 1974 to 1977, but its return was short-lived.

Group stages

The Championship was contested by 14 teams, divided into four groups. The top side in each group qualified for the semi-finals.

Group 1

Group 2

Group 3

Group 4

Playoff

There was a three-way playoff required in Group 3. Geevagh defeated Grange/Maugherow in the first tie, but Eastern Harps won the final playoff to claim the last semi-final spot.

Semi-finals

Sligo Senior Football Championship Final

References 

 Sligo Champion (July–September 1987)

Sligo Senior Football Championship
Sligo Senior Football Championship